A Presidential Emergency Facility (PEF), also called Presidential Emergency Relocation Centers and VIP Evacuation and Support Facilities, is a fortified, working residence intended for use by the president of the United States should normal presidential residences, such as the White House or Camp David, be destroyed or overrun during war or other types of national emergencies. Some Presidential Emergency Facilities are specially designated sections of existing government and military installations, while others are dedicated sites that have been purpose-built. Various sources state there are, or were, between 9 and 75 such facilities.

Quantity and location
In his 1984 journalistic expose “The Day After World War III”, Edward Zuckerman states there were then nine Presidential Emergency Facilities within a 25-minute helicopter trip from Washington, D.C. According to Zuckerman, sites known to him at that time were code-named Cartwheel (at Fort Reno Park), Corkscrew, Cowpuncher, and Cannonball (Cross Mountain, Pennsylvania), though all have since been decommissioned.   The White House itself is known as Crown while the presidential compound at the High Point Special Facility is Crystal (sometimes referred to as Crystal Palace).

In a 2004 report to the Federal Communications Commission (FCC) concerning Corkscrew, which at the time had been decommissioned as a PEF site and transferred to the FCC, historian David Rotenstein contended there were 75 PEFs “scattered throughout the United States”, a number also claimed by the Brookings Institution.

Design and staffing
Construction on Presidential Emergency Facilities began in the 1960s from classified, black budget government appropriations.

Purpose-built Presidential Emergency Facilities are silo-like structures constructed from reinforced concrete that sit atop an underground warren of bunkers and chambers designed to withstand a nuclear explosion. One of the few descriptions of a Presidential Emergency Facility observed while still in operation was provided by U.S. Coast Guard Captain Alex R. Larzelere, a former White House military aide, who visited one such site in 1968.

Larzelere went on to describe the subterranean interior of the site, noting there were quarters for the president and his staff with beds kept ready for immediate use with fresh linens, communications facilities, and stores stocked with emergency rations, medicine, and other supplies to sustain several people for a prolonged period.

Bill Gulley, a former U.S. Marine assigned to the White House Military Office, reported in 1980 that PEFs were all "manned twenty-four hours a day".

See also
Federal Relocation Arc
Ground-Mobile Command Center
White House Big Dig

References

Nuclear warfare
United States nuclear command and control
Disaster preparedness in the United States
Continuity of government in the United States